Plastindia Foundation is an apex body of plastics industry founded by major associations, organisations and institutions of plastics industry of India, it is also supported by Ministry of Chemicals and Fertilizers, Government of India connected with plastics. Plastindia Exhibition and Conference is held every three years. It is usually organized in the first or second week of February.

Plastindia Foundation's objective is to promote the development of plastic industry and to assist the growth of plastic and related products. The foundation aims at national progress through plastics. The foundation focuses on helping India to become the proffered sourcing base of plastic products around the world and also concentrates on facilitating the export led growth of the Indian plastic industry. It also helps boost export business volumes and revenues.

In 2020 Plastindia called off its trade show which was set to be held at New Delhi owing to ongoing Covid-19 pandemic.

References

External links 
 Official Website

Plastics industry in India
Ministry of Chemicals and Fertilizers
Trade associations based in India
Plastics industry organizations